The Montreal Street Circuit is a temporary street circuit in Montreal, Canada.  It is located in the southeast portion of the downtown area, with its main straight on René Lévesque Boulevard.

Track features

Usage
It was used for the Montreal ePrix of the single-seater, electrically powered Formula E championship. It was used during the 2016–17 Formula E season but has not been used since.

References

Formula E circuits
Montreal ePrix
Defunct motorsport venues in Canada